Little Indian Run (also known as Indian Camp Run) is a tributary of Little Muncy Creek in Lycoming County and Sullivan County, in Pennsylvania, in the United States. The surficial geology in the stream's vicinity mainly consists of alluvium, bedrock, Wisconsinan Till, Wisconsinan Till Moraine, and Wisconsinan Ice-Contact Stratified Drift. Wild trout naturally reproduce within the stream. A number of sawmills were historically located on the stream.

Course
Little Indian Run begins in a pond at the base of Huckleberry Mountain in Franklin Township, Lycoming County. It flows east-southeast for a few tenths of a mile, briefly passing through Davidson Township, Sullivan County. The stream then turns south-southwest for a few tenths of a mile, crossing Pennsylvania Route 42 before turning south-southeast for several tenths of a mile. In this reach, it passes through two more ponds and a wetland and receives an unnamed tributary from the left. It then turns south for more than a mile, its valley deepens, and it receives two unnamed tributaries from the left and two from the right. The stream then begins flowing south-southwest for several tenths of a mile along and/or the boundary between Franklin Township and Jordan Township. It then receives an unnamed tributary from the right and turns south. After several tenths of a mile, the stream reaches the end of its valley and turns west. After a few tenths of a mile, it turns southwest for a short distance, crossing Pennsylvania Route 442 and reaching its confluence with Little Muncy Creek.

Geography and geology

The surficial geology along the middle reaches of the valley floor of Little Indian Run mainly consists of alluvium. However, bedrock consisting of sandstone and shale makes up the surficial geology on the sides of the stream's valley in this reach. Further upstream, there are large patches of Wisconsinan Till and Wisconsinan Till Moraine and smaller patches of Wisconsinan Ice-Contact Stratified Drift, which contains stratified sand, gravel, and some boulders.

The upper reaches of Little Indian Run are in an area that was covered in glaciers during the Wisconsinan Glaciation. However, the lower reaches are beyond the maximum extend of the glaciers. Red rock of the Catskill Formation occurs near the stream, and various fish fossils have been observed in this rock.

Watershed and biology
The mouth of the stream is in the United States Geological Survey quadrangle of Lairdsville. However, its source is in the quadrangle of Sonestown. The stream's mouth is located near Unityville.

A bridge carrying T-738 over Little Indian Run is owned by Jordan Township. The Transcontinental Gas Pipe Line Company, LLC. has applied for and/or received a permit to build and maintain a natural gas pipeline crossing the stream.

History
Little Indian Run was entered into the Geographic Names Information System on August 2, 1979. Its identifier in the Geographic Names Information System is 1179566. The stream is also known as Indian Camp Run. This variant name appears in the 1880 book The Geology of Lycoming County by Andrew Sherwood and Franklin Platt.

Historically, there were three sawmills on Little Indian Run: the I.J. Boudeman Saw Mill, the F. Cleman Saw Mill, and the Smith & Magargel Saw Mill.

Biology
Little Indian Run is classified as a Coldwater Fishery and a Migratory Fishery. Wild trout naturally reproduce in the stream from its headwaters downstream to its mouth.

See also
Beaver Run (Little Muncy Creek), next tributary of Little Muncy Creek going downstream
West Branch Little Muncy Creek, next tributary of Little Muncy Creek going upstream
List of rivers of Pennsylvania

References

Rivers of Lycoming County, Pennsylvania
Rivers of Sullivan County, Pennsylvania
Tributaries of Muncy Creek
Rivers of Pennsylvania